Toby Tarnow (born June 15, 1937, in Gravelbourg, Saskatchewan, Canada) is a Canadian actress. She was the first actress to portray the popular Anne Shirley of Anne of Green Gables in Canadian radio then in Canadian television in a 1956 television movie.

Career 
Her most popular work included the part of Princess Summerfall Winterspring on the Canadian version of the Howdy Doody Show on CBC television, a regular panelist on the Canadian To Tell the Truth, a regular role in CTV'S forensic police drama The Collaborators (1973–74), a regular on the children's show, Mr. Dressup, a continuing character on the Canadian soap opera Moment of Truth, and a continuing role in the miniseries Amerika and a children's television show, Nursery School Time with Miss Toby and Hoppy.

In 2012, Toby was awarded the Children's and Youth Theatre Award by the New Hampshire Theatre Awards.

Personal life 
In August 1989, she moved to New Hampshire.

Filmography

Film

Television

References

External links
 
 Northern Stars profile

1937 births
Canadian expatriates in the United States
Canadian radio actresses
Canadian voice actresses
Canadian television actresses
Living people
Actresses from Saskatchewan
People from Gravelbourg, Saskatchewan
20th-century Canadian actresses